Carthage is a city and the county seat of Panola County, Texas, United States. This city is situated in deep East Texas, 20 miles west of the Louisiana state line. Its population was 6,569 at the 2020 census.

History

Carthage was founded in 1847, two years after Texas was admitted to the United States. During the Civil War, men from Carthage and Panola County served as Confederate soldiers. African-American resident Milton M. Holland, formerly enslaved, served as a Union sergeant and earned a Medal of Honor.

Carthage, Mississippi was established in 1834, and became the county seat. The Harris family were early settlers, and named the town after their former home of Carthage, Tennessee. When Carthage, Texas established in 1848, it was named after Carthage, Mississippi.  

After the Civil War, population growth was slow, but large amounts of cotton, corn, sweet potatoes, oats, and sugarcane were produced in the county. The city began to expand in 1888 when a railroad reached Carthage, along with telegraph and telephone lines.

During the Great Depression, a gas field was discovered near Carthage. After World War II, this gas field was developed and proved to be the largest in the United States. The city flourished, with the population increasing from about 1,300 to 5,000. During this period, a courthouse and a high school were built. In 1947 Panola County Junior College was established in Carthage and founded KGAS-AM 1590 which began broadcasting in 1955.

As a result of 19.6% population growth between 1970 and 1980, documented by U.S. Decennial Census; Panola General Hospital was established in 1997. Today the ETMC Carthage operates a 24-hour emergency department which is designated a Level IV trauma center by the state of Texas.

On August 22, 1998 the Tex Ritter Museum in Carthage was the site for the grand opening of the Texas Country Music Hall of Fame, honoring those who have made outstanding contributions to country music and born in the state of Texas.

On September 16, 1998 KGAS-FM began broadcasting a country music format in Carthage, and was featured in "Bernie", the 2011 American biographical black comedy crime film directed by Richard Linklater.

1996 murder of Marjorie Nugent 

After losing her husband, widow Marjorie Nugent, an 81-year-old resident of Carthage, became friends with Bernie Tiede, the assistant funeral director in town. In late 1996, townspeople did not see her, but thought perhaps she had moved to join her out-of-town family. When the family could not reach her, they filed a missing-person's report. Nine months after her death, her friend and companion, 39-year-old Bernie Tiede, was brought in for questioning by police and confessed to killing her. He claimed she had emotionally abused him.

He shot her four times in the back with a .22 rifle in November 1996. A mortician, he cleaned her body and placed it in a freezer in her house, where it was not discovered until 1997. Tiede continued his community activities for several months after her death. He was convicted of first-degree murder and sentenced to life in prison. After a habeas corpus challenge, he was paroled on a $10,000 bond in 2014, but in 2016, Tiede had a resentencing hearing, and was sentenced to 99 years to life.

Panola County District Attorney Danny Buck Davidson said initially that few in the community questioned no longer seeing the elderly woman. He said, "That's what you do when you're a con guy and you move in. He had her cut all ties, so ultimately the only person she had to rely on was him. Mrs. Nugent was a human being. She didn't deserve her fate at the hands of Bernie." Tiede apparently killed the wealthy woman to get control of her money, spending an estimated $3 million of Nugent's $10 million. Davidson said Tiede used some of it for philanthropy: "He sent people to college. He donated to musicals, plays and bought instruments at the college. That was all done with Mrs. Nugent's money. After she was in the freezer, he really jumped out there as a benefactor."

An article about these events in Texas Monthly by Skip Hollandsworth was adapted for Bernie, a 2011 dark comedy film which he co-wrote with director Richard Linklater. It starred Jack Black, Shirley MacLaine, Matthew McConaughey and was highly praised by Hollywood fans in the local community.

Geography

The climate in this area is characterized by hot, humid summers and generally mild to cool winters.  According to the Köppen climate classification, Carthage has a humid subtropical climate, Cfa on climate maps.

Demographics

As of the 2020 United States census, there were 6,569 people, 2,550 households, and 1,739 families residing in the city.

As of the census of 2010, 6,779 people, 2,628 households, and 1,745 families resided in the city. The population density was 645.6 people per mi2 (249.2/km). The 2,909 housing units averaged 277.0 per mi2 (106.9/km). The racial makeup of the city was 69.5% White, 21.1% African American, 0.5% Native American, 0.7% Asian, 6.5% from other races, and 1.7% from two or more races. Hispanics or Latinos of any race were 11.0% of the population.

Of the 2,628 households, 29.8% had children under the age of 18 living with them, 45.6% were married couples living together, 16.4% had a female householder with no husband present, and 33.6% were not families. About 30.5% of all households were made up of individuals, and 14.8% had someone living alone who was 65 years of age or older. The average household size was 2.45 and the average family size was 3.04.

In the city, the age distribution was 24.6% under 18, 11.2% from 18 to 24, 23.9% from 25 to 44, 24.1% from 45 to 64, and 16.3% who were 65 or older. The median age was 35.9 years. For every 100 females, there were 88.3 males. For every 100 females age 18 and over, there were 83.8 males.

As of the 2000 Census, the median income for a household in the city was $31,822, and for a family was $37,031. Males had a median income of $33,080 versus $21,473 for females. The per capita income for the city was $16,332. About 11.8% of families and 13.2% of the population were below the poverty line, including 15.2% of those under age 18 and 12.9% of those age 65 or over.

Culture and arts

The Texas Country Music Hall of Fame is located in Carthage, which also houses the Tex Ritter Museum. The Jim Reeves Memorial is located on the outskirts of Carthage, east on U.S. 79. Reeves and Ritter were from the nearby unincorporated communities of Galloway and Murvaul, respectively.

Education
 
The City of Carthage services the Carthage Independent School District as well as the two-year community college of Panola College located adjacent Carthage City Hall.

Media
Carthage is served by two local radio stations: KGAS 1590 AM and KGAS 104.3 FM, and by a local newspaper, The Panola Watchman. The nearest media market of notable size is in nearby Shreveport, Louisiana.

Notable people

 Jacke Davis was an American professional baseball outfielder, who spent eight seasons in professional baseball, including part of one season in Major League Baseball (MLB) with the Philadelphia Phillies
 Milton M. Holland was born the son of a slave owner but became the first native Texan to be awarded the Medal of Honor for his actions at the Battle of Chaffin's Farm
 Philip Humber is an American former professional baseball who pitched for the New York Mets, Minnesota Twins, Kansas City Royals, Chicago White Sox, and the Houston Astros in seven MLB seasons. On April 21, 2012 against Seattle Mariners Philip Humber pitched a perfect game for Chicago White Sox

 Mildred Fay Jefferson was the first American black woman to graduate from Harvard Medical School; as well as being former president and founding member of the National Right to Life Committee
 John Booty is an American former football defensive back in the National Football League (NFL) for the New York Jets, the Philadelphia Eagles and the Tampa Bay Buccaneers. He played college football at the Texas Christian University, and was drafted in the tenth round of the 1988 NFL Draft.
 Derek Wayne Johnson is an American film director, screenwriter, film producer and 3rd Level Black Belt in the art of American Karate inducted into the AMAA Who's Who in the Martial Arts Hall of Fame alongside Chuck Norris, Benny Urquidez and other influential martial artists
 Margie Neal was a newspaper publisher and first American woman elected to Texas State Senate in 1926 A Texas Historical Marker in the center of town recognizes her achievements.
 Jim Reeves was an American country and popular music singer-songwriter, with records charting from 1950s to 1980s known as "Gentleman Jim"
 Brandon Rhyder is an American Texas Country/Red Dirt singer, graduated from the University of Texas at Tyler with a degree in Industrial Technology
 Tex Ritter was an American actor from the mid 1930s into the 1960s, as well as a pioneer of American country music
 Jack Boynton Strong was an American politician and lawyer who served as a Democrat in the Texas Senate between 1963 and 1971, and then served on the Texas Board of Education from 1971 to 1979
 Bernie Tiede is formerly a mortician convicted of murdering widow Marjorie Nugent; portrayed in 2011 by Jack Black in Bernie

References

External links
 Carthage, Texas
 The Carthage_TX community on LiveJournal.com
 The 1997 Nugent murder
 East Texas Medical Center Carthage

Cities in Texas
Cities in Panola County, Texas
County seats in Texas